Harry Henderson may refer to:

 Harry Henderson (cricketer) (1923–1997), English cricketer
 Harry Henderson (boxer) (1904–1976), American boxer
 Harry Henderson (footballer) (1880–1964), Australian rules footballer
 Harry Henderson (Neighbours), character on the Australian soap opera Neighbours

See also
 Harry and the Hendersons, a 1987 American film
 Harold Henderson (disambiguation)
Henry Henderson (disambiguation)